Kaisermühlen may refer to:

 Kaisermühlen, Vienna, a neighbourhood in the Donaustadt district
 Kaisermühlen (Vienna U-Bahn), on line U1
 Kaisermühlen Blues, an Austrian television series